The 2021 BC Lions season was the 63rd season for the team in the Canadian Football League (CFL) and their 67th overall. The Lions failed to improve upon their 5–13 record from 2019 and were eliminated from playoff qualification on November 12, 2021, following a week 15 loss to the Calgary Stampeders.

The 2021 CFL season was the first season with Rick Campbell as the team's head coach. Campbell will also perform general manager duties alongside co-general manager Neil McEvoy following the resignation of former general manager Ed Hervey.

The Lions held their training camp at Hillside Stadium in Kamloops, British Columbia for the 11th consecutive season.

An 18-game season schedule was originally released on November 20, 2020, but it was announced on April 21, 2021 that the start of the season would likely be delayed until August and feature a 14-game schedule. On June 15, 2021, the league released the revised 14-game schedule with regular season play beginning on August 5, 2021.

Offseason

General manager
On October 16, 2020, the team's general manager, Ed Hervey, announced his resignation due to personal reasons. There had been speculation that his departure from the organization was related to the grievance filed by starting quarterback Mike Reilly who was guaranteed $250,000 in 2020, despite the season being cancelled. However, this was never confirmed and the Lions eventually reached an agreement to re-structure Reilly's contract.

On December 7, 2020, it was announced that head coach Rick Campbell and director of football operations Neil McEvoy were promoted to co-general managers.

CFL Global Draft
The 2021 CFL Global Draft took place on April 15, 2021. The Lions won the draft lottery and selected first overall. With the format being a snake draft, the Lions selected first in the odd-numbered rounds and last in the even-numbered rounds.

CFL National Draft
The 2021 CFL Draft took place on May 4, 2021. The Lions had five selections in the six-round snake draft and had the fourth pick in odd rounds and the sixth pick in even rounds. The team traded its fourth-round selection to the Toronto Argonauts after trading Davon Coleman in exchange for Shawn Lemon.

Preseason
Due to the shortening of the season, the CFL confirmed that pre-season games would not be played in 2021.

Planned schedule

Regular season

Standings

Schedule
The Lions initially had a schedule that featured 18 regular season games beginning on June 12 and ending on October 29. However, due to the COVID-19 pandemic in Canada, the Canadian Football League delayed the start of the regular season to August 5, 2021 and the Lions will begin their 14-game season on August 6, 2021.

 Games played with colour uniforms.
 Games played with white uniforms.

Team

Roster

Coaching staff

References

External links
 

BC Lions seasons
BC Lions
BC Lions season